Sublimity City is an unincorporated community located in Laurel County, Kentucky, United States.  Originally known as the Sublimity Forest Community, it was developed under the authority of the Emergency Relief Appropriation Act of 1935.

References

Unincorporated communities in Laurel County, Kentucky
Unincorporated communities in Kentucky